The slender-billed greenfinch ("Carduelis" aurelioi) is an extinct songbird in the finch family Fringillidae. It was endemic to the island Tenerife in the Canary Islands, and became extinct after human settlement of the islands.

Taxonomy 
The slender-billed greenfinch was described in 2010 and originally placed in the genus Carduelis with other greenfinches, but living greenfinches were later moved to the separate genus Chloris in 2012. The combination of Chloris aurelioi has not been used in the subsequent academic literature.

Description
The bill of the slender-billed greenfinch was longer, thinner, and more conical than the bills of other greenfinches, more similar in shape to the bills of chaffinches.

References

Extinct birds of Atlantic islands
Birds described in 2010
Chloris (bird)
Holocene extinctions
Late Quaternary prehistoric birds